"WusYaName" (stylized in all caps) is a song by American rapper and producer Tyler, the Creator featuring fellow American rapper YoungBoy Never Broke Again and American singer Ty Dolla $ign. It was released on June 22, 2021, alongside a retro-themed music video, as the second single from Tyler's sixth studio album, Call Me If You Get Lost. A '90s-inspired R&B record, it samples H-Town's "Back Seat (Wit No Sheets)", and sees Tyler rapping and singing to a mysterious woman he becomes love-struck with while on a road trip. The song was noted for its production and Tyler's delivery, and is the highest-charting track from the album.

Background
The song was first teased by Tyler on June 22, 2021, when he posted the music video, which omitted YoungBoy's verse. Tyler said one of his favorite moments on the album is when YoungBoy says "think so" on the song. Following the song's release, Tyler, while at a pop-up concert, called YoungBoy a "sweetheart" and said they hung out a number of times. "WusYaName" was produced solely by Tyler.

Composition
Regarded as a departure from Tyler's previous musical style, it contains G-funk synths and a "distinct throwback" sound, courtesy of the sampled track, "Back Seat (Wit No Sheets)" (1994) by R&B group H-Town, paired with a New Jack Swing-styled R&B. Ryan Rosenberger of Elevator Mag said the song "carries the same soulful, cinematic vibes as Igor did, with its lush, intricate vocal arrangements and hardknocking boombap drums". The song's intro starts off with a monologue by Tyler in which he delves into California's car culture and reflects on having a love at first sight. After the monologue ends, the "romantic, '90s infused melody" kicks in, in the form of the repurposed sample which uses four loops in the song with a pitch and tempo increase. Deemed a "sexy", "flirty" R&B ballad, it sees Tyler delivering his "signature" wordplay, rapping and singing about pouring syrup on eggs, looking for brioche a friend recommended, and envisioning flying the woman he likes to Cannes to watch independent movies. Furthermore, he lists off all the experiences and journeys he wants her to have, before realizing he is in over his head and does not even know her name, which leads into the chorus in which he asks her name. Tyler affectionately refers to his romantic interest as "She". HipHopDXs Michael Saponara noted: "Tyler uses his verse as a lyrical exercise as he shows off his rhyming ability telling the girl they should go to Cannes to watch some movies they never heard of or how he could give her skincare routine tips".  The song features background vocals from, among others, Ty Dolla Sign, Odd Future's Jasper Dolphin, a "wistful" rap verse from YoungBoy Never Broke Again, and ad-libs from DJ Drama.

Critical reception
HipHopDX named "WusYaName" among the best hip hop songs of the first half of 2021, and said it "stands out with its lush instrumentation and teed up features from YoungBoy Never Broke Again and Ty Dolla $ign. Tyler always brings out the best in his guests and this is yet another example". Naming it among the best new releases of the week, Complexs Jessica McKinney called it a standout from Call Me If You Get Lost, lauding NBA YoungBoy for being in "rare form" on the track. Closed Cap was highly positive of the song, writing: "His (Tyler's) narrative is calming and sets the stage for his lyrical explosion. The beat is magical and flocked with nineties R&B while he raps like a machine gun over the music. Tyler is at the top of his game here lyrically and musically. The song pops with a fresh approach mixed with hints of nostalgia and works from the jump". Lyrical Lemonade's Danny Adams said the song is "gentle, soulful, and dreamy, much like many of his recent records have, and the swagger he has behind his delivery is unmatched".

Music video
The song's official video was directed by Tyler under his Wolf Haley moniker, alongside director of photography Luis Panch Perez and producer Tara Razavi. It features the same "grainy oversaturated visual style" of other videos from Call Me If You Get Lost. The video follows Tyler as he drives through the countryside in a Lancia Delta Intergrale, arriving at a French patisserie, struggles to win over a woman who catches his eye, and, as Vulture's Zoe Haylock noted, appears in a "garden seating filled with black and brown people riding bikes, playing games, enjoying their day". Chron.com's Shelby Stewart summarized the ending: "the video concludes with a villain origin story plot twist: it turns out that Tyler's crush was totally unaware of his singing". She instead walks to her date, Odd Future's Taco Bennett, who sits at a table nearby. It was suggested that the video is a prequel to "Side Street", a teaser video Tyler released prior to the album, as both videos feature the same woman (played by Helena Howard) as Tyler's love interest and sees him sport the same mint-green nail polish. Closed Cap commended the video for having "a flair of style you don't commonly see today", emphasizing: "Even the shots of the hills as he drives are done so with prestige and professionalism".

Chart performance
The song debuted at number 14 on the Billboard Hot 100, becoming the highest-charting song from Call Me If You Get Lost. On the Rolling Stone Top 100, it was the highest entry from the album, debuting at number four with 19 million streams. In the UK, the song also had the biggest success, debuting at number 25.

Charts

Weekly charts

Year-end charts

Certifications

Release history

References

2021 singles
2021 songs
2020s ballads
Tyler, the Creator songs
Songs written by Tyler, the Creator
YoungBoy Never Broke Again songs
Songs written by YoungBoy Never Broke Again
Ty Dolla Sign songs
Songs written by Ty Dolla Sign
DJ Drama songs
Contemporary R&B ballads
Columbia Records singles